The Columbus Discoverers were a minor league baseball team based in Columbus, Mississippi. Between 1907 and 1935, the Columbus Discoverers and "Joy Riders" teams played as members of the Cotton States League from 1907 to 1908 and 1912 to 1913, before the 1935 Columbus "Bengals" played a partial season in the East Dixie League. Columbus hosted home minor league games exclusively at Fairgrounds Park.

History
Columbus, Mississippi first hosted minor league baseball in 1907.  The Columbus "Discoverers" became members of the six–team Class D level Cotton States League. The Gulfport Crabs, Jackson Senators, Meridian White Ribbons, Mobile Sea Gulls and Vicksburg Hill Billies joined Columbus in 1907 league play.

The 1907 Columbus Discoverers finished last in their first season of play. The Discoverers ended the season with a record of 42–96 to place 6th in the final standings. Managed by Jack Law, Columbus finished 42.5 games behind the 1st place Mobile Sea Gulls in the final standings, as the league had no playoffs.

The Columbus Discoverers continued Cotton States League play in 1908.  The Discoverers ended the season in 4th place with a final record of 58–56. Managed by Billy May, Louis Hall, Ace Stewart and Jack Toft, Columbus finished 12.0 games behind the 1st place Jackson Senators in the six–team league. Pitcher Al Demaree of Columbus led the Cotton States League with 23 wins. Following the 1908 season, the Cotton States League did not play in 1909 and returned to play in 1910 without a Columbus franchise.

In 1912, Columbus rejoined the six–team Class D level Cotton States League during the season. The Columbus Joy Riders began play when the Hattiesburg Timberjacks franchise moved to Columbus, Mississippi on June 5, 1912 with a record of 19–24. Compiling a 37–35 record while based in Columbus, the team finished with an overall record of 56–59, playing under manager Carlos Smith in both locations. The Hattiesburg/Columbus team finished 13.5 games behind the 1st place Vicksburg Hill Billies in the final standings. Pitcher Walt Kinney of Columbus led the Cotton States League with 22 wins.

On June 11, 1912, Columbus played a double header against the Yazoo City Zoos. Reportedly, the Columbus catcher was injured in the 2nd inning of the first game and Columbus did not have another player to play catcher. Taylor, the catcher for Yazoo City then volunteered to play catcher for both teams in order for the games to be played. Yazoo City was noted to have won both games, with Taylor catching 32 total innings behind the plate.

The Columbus Joy Riders continued play in the 1913 Cotton States League. The Joy Riders ended the 1913 season in 4th place with a record of 40–57, playing under manager Bob Kennedy in Columbus' final season of Cotton League play. The Joy Riders finished 32.0 games behind the 1st place Jackson Lawmakers. Pitcher Ed Poole of Columbus led the league with 163 strikeouts. The Cotton States League shortened their season to August 15, 1913 and did not return to play in 1914, due to World War I.

Minor league baseball returned to Columbus, Mississippi in 1935 for a final season. The Columbus Bengals briefly played as members of the eight–team Class C level East Dixie League. On June 18, 1935, the Columbus Bengals moved to Cleveland, Mississippi with a record of 36–41. After compiling a 28–32 record based in Cleveland, the Cleveland Bengals team placed 6th in the final standings under manager Slim Brewer, with a 64–73 overall record. Columbus/Cleveland finished 19.5 games behind the 1st place Pine Bluff Judges in the final standings. The East Dixie League permanently folded following the 1935 season.

Columbus, Mississippi has not hosted another minor league team.

The ballparks
Columbus minor league teams were noted to have played home games at Fairgrounds Park. Today, the Columbus Fairgrounds are still in use as a public fairgrounds, owned by the city of Columbus. The location is 764 Highway 69 South, Columbus, Mississippi.

Timeline

Year-by-year record

Notable alumni

Mack Allison (1908)
Orth Collins (1907)
Al Demaree (1908)
Billy Kinloch (1907)
Frank Manush (1907–1908)
Ken Penner (1913)
Phil Redding (1912)
Culley Rikard (1935)
Dolly Stark (1907)
Ace Stewart (1907), (1908, MGR)
Ollie Welf (1912)
Fred Williams (1935)

See also
Columbus Discoverers playersColumbus Bengals playersColumbus Joy Riders players

References

Defunct minor league baseball teams
Defunct baseball teams in Mississippi
Cotton States league
Baseball teams established in 1907
Baseball teams disestablished in 1908
Cotton States League teams
Columbus, Mississippi